Saskatchewan Landing may refer to:
Rural Municipality of Saskatchewan Landing No. 167, Saskatchewan, Canada
Saskatchewan Landing Provincial Park, a provincial park in Saskatchewan, Canada